Sexual selection is described as natural selection arising through preference by one sex for certain characteristics in individuals of the other sex. Sexual selection is a common concept in animal evolution but, with plants, it is oftentimes overlooked because many plants are hermaphrodites. Flowering plants show many characteristics that are often sexually selected for. For example, flower symmetry, nectar production, floral structure, and inflorescences are just a few of the many secondary sex characteristics acted upon by sexual selection. Sexual dimorphisms and reproductive organs can also be affected by sexual selection in flowering plants.

Mechanisms of sexual selection 
There are two main mechanisms of sexual selection in flowering plants, one being intra-sexual competition and the other being female mate choice. Intra-sexual selection is responsible for much of floral evolution and diversification. Intrasexual selection, with the help of pollinators, has also led to some of the most remarkable examples of exaggerated traits of among hermaphroditic plants. Similarly, sexual dimorphism has probably been involved in the evolution of sexual dimorphism in floral traits of dioecious plants, and likely also in the evolution of secondary sexual dimorphism through genetic correlations with floral traits. Sexual selection through female choice is perhaps a more difficult concept to apply to plants. There is evidence that females (or the female function of hermaphrodites) exercise choice, especially during fertilization. These two mechanisms are the main driving forces of sexual selection in flowering plants.

Symmetry and structure 

Floral symmetry is often acted on by sexual selection. Floral characters are often subject to strong directional selection from pollinators, and this may disrupt developmental homeostasis in flowers that can develop into large degrees of fluctuating asymmetry. Fluctuating asymmetry in floral traits may lead to sexual selection in plants if pollinators visit symmetrical flowers in an assortative manner. Numerous studies have shown that pollinators preferentially visited more symmetrical floral patterns in flowers, and there are several believed reasons why this pollinator preference exists. First, the preference may be present due to positive reinforcement. From experience, pollinators may learn that asymmetrical flowers provide a lesser award than symmetrical ones. Second, sensory biases predisposed to pollinators could cause them to select symmetrical flowers. This pollinator preference can lead to symmetrical flowers that are fertilized more often. This increase in fertilization frequency increases the amount of seeds produced, and results in an increased production of offspring with symmetrical, attractive flowers.

Sexual dimorphisms 
There are numerous examples of sexual dimorphisms in flowering plants. Sexual dimorphic differences include bud abortion, flower size, flower number per plant, floral longevity, nutrient content of flowers, nectar production, flowering phenology and periodicity, floral fragrances, floral defense against herbivory, and various inflorescence characteristics including total flower number, daily display size, and inflorescence architecture. In animal-pollinated species, these differences affect pollinator visitation, competition for mates, and the evolution of sexual dimorphisms. However, there are constraints placed on animal-pollinated species, because too much divergence could interfere with mating success if pollinators are more attracted to one sex than the other, or if the sexes attract different pollinators. Such constraints are absent from wind-pollinated plants, and the contrasting biophysical requirements for pollen dispersal and pollen capture have led to striking cases of sexual dimorphism in plant architecture and flower production in some species. Below are some specific examples of sexual dimorphisms in flowering plants.

Inflorescences 

Inflorescences can be acted on by sexual selection in many ways, and commonly include arrangement, number, and size. For example, male inflorescence in plants often produce more flowers than females . Furthermore, pollen export and ultimately paternity, often increases with flower number, even for plants with hermaphroditic flowers. Retention of older flowers with no pollinator rewards can lead to increased pollinator visitation rate and increased pollen removal. Studies suggest that there has been selection for increased pollen delivery, achieved through greater inflorescence size, and it seems probable that male-male competition is commonly part of that selection pressure.

Corolla 
Corollas are the petals of flowers, and also face sexual selection. Traits such as color, shape, size, and symmetry are often faced by sexually selected pressure. One example is that male flowers are often larger than female flowers, at least in some species. Although this is presumably achieved through resource allocation mechanisms, it is unlikely that resource allocation from lower cost of androecium than gynoecium leading to higher expenditure on corolla in males, is a general and complete explanation of the size differences. Some corolla enlargement may arise by means of selection on correlated characters such as pollen production. However, it is likely that male competition often contributes directly to the evolution of large male corollas, especially where pollen availability is not limiting.

Nectar production 

Nectar production is different for every flowering plant, and has many different selective forces acting upon it. There is no  specific evolutionary force that drives nectar production, but it is believed that sexual selection plays a major role. Studies have supported the idea that sexual selection is a probable explanation for at least some species with gender-biased nectar production. For example, gender-biased expression of nectar is often accompanied by a similarly biased expression of other floral characteristics. A specific example comes from the flowers of Impatiens capensis, and how they show increased longevity of the more-rewarding male phase . In other species, petals can be seen to wilt notably during the less- rewarding female phase or they change color as they pass into the less-rewarding female phase. More evidence for sexually selected nectar production relies on specific behaviors of the pollinators. If sexual selection is currently maintaining gender-biased nectar production, pollinators must be able to distinguish between male and female phase flowers. They also must visit preferentially flowers of the more-rewarding phase. For species that have discriminating pollinators, increased rewards can result in increased mating success, which would allow nectar to be a sexually selected trait.

Reproductive organs 
Androecium are often faced by the pressures of sexual selection. This is particularly evident when pollen is produced; there may be several sources of sexual selection on the ways that pollen is presented to pollen vectors. Because pollen is packaged in units that ensure that several to many pollen grains travel together as in pollinia, polyads, viscin threads, etc., pollen donors may be able to monopolize stigmas and the associated ovules by blocking access by other males, unless selection also favors compensating stigma enlargement. Furthermore, when pollen germination depends on some minimum number of pollen grains to overcome stigmatic inhibition, which is a mechanism that heightens male competition, there may be selection for large pollen dispersal units or certain other pollen-dispensing mechanisms. If pollinator visits are few, then there is selection to package pollen in a way that all of it can be removed by one visit . When repeated pollinator visits are typical, there may be selection for various temporal patterns of pollen presentation and various methods of pollen dispensing. Variation in stamen length, both within and among flowers influences pollen dispersal and potential male reproductive success. Increasing the opportunity for paternity by distributing pollen among pollinators may take different routes in different systems, and any of these possibilities can be viewed in a sexual selection context . The gynoecium  is  also affected by sexual selection.  Every part from the ovaries, styles, stigma, and carpels can be faced with the pressures of sexual selection. In ovule packaging, the intensity of pollen competition depends in part on the number of pollen grains relative to the number of ovules. Although many factors may contribute to determining ovule number, one way for females to increase the level of pollen competition is to decrease ovule number while maintaining stigma size. The evolution of functional syncarpy (assuming no other attendant changes) presumably is a simultaneous increase in the number of ovules accessible from one stigma, which tended to decrease the intensity of pollen competition, and a concentration of pollen deposition on a single stigma, which tends to increase pollen competition. Further increases in pollen competition could be brought about by an increase in pollen delivery (through change of pollinator, increased attractiveness of floral display, or rewards), a decrease in ovule number or stigma size, changes in temporal patterns of stigma receptivity, or changes in the competitive environment of the carpel .

References 

Sexual selection
Evolution of plants